Cottonwood Pass may refer to:

 Cottonwood Pass (Continental Divide), a mountain pass on the Continental Divide of the Americas in the Sawatch Range of Colorado, United States
 Cottonwood Pass (Eagle County, Colorado), a mountain pass in Eagle County, Colorado; see List of places in Colorado
 Cottonwood Pass (Grand County, Colorado), a mountain pass in Grand County, Colorado; see List of places in Colorado

See also
 Cottonwood (disambiguation)
 
 La Paz County, Arizona, United States
 Riverside County, California, United States
 San Luis Obispo County, California, United States
 Sierra Nevada of California, United States
 Clark County, Nevada, United States
 Lander County, Nevada, United States
 Oglala Lakota County, South Dakota, United States
 Garfield County, Utah, United States
 Fremont County, Wyoming, United States